Lucien Edward Blackwell (August 1, 1931 – January 24, 2003) was an American boxer, longshoreman, and politician. He served as a Democratic member of the Pennsylvania House of Representatives from 1973 to 1975, Philadelphia City Council from 1975 to 1991, and the United States House of Representatives from 1991 to 1995.

Early life
Blackwell was born in Whitsett, Fayette County, Pennsylvania on August 1, 1931. After attending West Philadelphia High School, he took a job as a dockworker and briefly pursued a career as a boxer. In 1953, he was drafted into the United States Army and served in the Korean War. Blackwell was a boxing champion during his years in the Army. After his service ended, he returned to the docks as a longshoreman. In 1973, he became the president of the International Longshoremen's Association, Local 1332.

Pennsylvania politics
Blackwell's professional political career began with election to the Pennsylvania House of Representatives where he served from 1973 to 1975.

Philadelphia City Council
"Lucien the Solution" was best known as a vibrant member of the Philadelphia City Council from 1975 to 1991. While serving on the Council, Blackwell served several terms as Chairman of the Finance Committee, where he led the charge to divest pension funds from businesses doing business in South Africa. Blackwell also sponsored the Philadelphia's first law to create opportunities for minorities and women to compete to obtain city contracts. Blackwell was also heavily involved in legislation to create the Pennsylvania Convention Center and in passing the law that broke Philadelphia's long-standing building height limit, allowing for the construction of Philadelphia's One Liberty Place. Blackwell was perhaps best known for his fiery oratory on the Council floor and for serving as a mentor to the former Philadelphia Mayor (and Council President) John Street. During his City Council tenure, Blackwell was an unsuccessful candidate for mayor of Philadelphia in both 1979 and 1991.

United States House of Representatives
Blackwell was elected as a Democrat to the One Hundred Second Congress by special election to fill the vacancy caused by the resignation of Representative Bill Gray, and reelected to the succeeding Congress. In Congress, Blackwell was a member of the United States House Committee on the Budget and a reliable advocate for President Bill Clinton's economic policies.

Blackwell was ultimately an unsuccessful candidate for renomination to the One Hundred Fourth Congress in 1994, losing the primary to Chaka Fattah, and served as lobbyist following his tenure in Congress.

Death and legacy
On January 24, 2003, Blackwell died at the age of 71. A mural reading "Thank you, Mr. Blackwell", can be seen at 42nd Street and Haverford Avenue in West Philadelphia. Blackwell's widow, Jannie Blackwell, was formerly a member of the Philadelphia City Council, also representing the Third District, and his son, Thomas, was a former member of the Pennsylvania House of Representatives.

See also

List of African-American United States representatives

References

External links
 Retrieved on 2008-07-20

The Political Graveyard

1931 births
2003 deaths
Democratic Party members of the Pennsylvania House of Representatives
African-American state legislators in Pennsylvania
United States Army personnel of the Korean War
Philadelphia City Council members
African-American members of the United States House of Representatives
International Longshoremen's Association people
American trade union leaders
African-American United States Army personnel
Military personnel from Philadelphia
Democratic Party members of the United States House of Representatives from Pennsylvania
United States Army soldiers
20th-century American politicians
20th-century African-American politicians
African-American men in politics
21st-century African-American people
African Americans in the Korean War
West Philadelphia High School alumni